Max Weismann (June 8, 1936 Chicago, IL – February 22, 2017) was an American philosopher and a long-time friend and colleague of Mortimer Adler, with whom he co-founded the Center for the Study of the Great Ideas in Chicago. He is director and president of the Center and has dedicated his time and talents to promoting the philosophical and pedagogical ideas of Dr. Adler, especially the importance of the study of the "Great Books". He also compiled, edited and published, How To Think About the Great Ideas: From the Great Books of Western Civilization, a 600-page tome of never published work from Adler's television series, The Great Ideas. Weismann serves as chairman of the Great Books Academy (over 3000 students) and is a Fellow at the Adler-Aquinas Institute.

Prior to his career in philosophy and education with Dr Adler, Weismann was a consultant in the field of architecture, construction management and exhibit design and fabrication. He worked on famous projects like the Century 21 Exposition, 1964 New York World's Fair and Expo 67, with such notables as Dr. Athelstan Spilhaus, Walt Disney, Frank Lloyd Wright, Buckminster Fuller, Mies van der Rohe, Louis I. Kahn, Paul Rudolph, Marcel Breur, José Luis Sert, Edward Durell Stone, Minoru Yamasaki, Harry Weese, Moshe Safdie, Jacques Yves Cousteau, Alexander Calder, and Edward Larrabee Barnes. Weismann oversaw the development and construction of the Chicago Botanic Garden.

Weismann also invented a revolutionary color imaging system, that was used worldwide in the fields of color proofing and printing, graphic design, television and advertising.

See also
 American philosophy
 List of American philosophers

References

External links
The Center for the Study of The Great Ideas
Great Books Academy

20th-century American philosophers
Living people
1936 births